The Constitution of the Federal Democratic Republic of Ethiopia, also known as the 1995 Constitution of Ethiopia, is the supreme law of Ethiopia. The constitution came into force on 21 August 1995 after it was drawn up by the Constituent Assembly that was elected in June 1994. It was adopted by the Transitional Government of Ethiopia on 8 December 1994 and came into force following the general election held in May–June 1995.

Structure
The constitution consists of 106 articles in 11 chapters. Articles I-VII contains general provisions on matters of nomenclature of state, territorial jurisdiction, and the Ethiopian flag; Articles VIII-XII describe sovereignty, the supremacy of the constitution, democratic rights, separation of state and religion, and accountability of the government. It provides for a federal government of nine ethnically based regions governed by a parliament divided into the House of Peoples' Representatives and the House of Federation. It provides for a parliamentary system, with a mostly ceremonial president as head of state, and executive power vested in a Council of Ministers headed by a prime minister.

The constitution expressly provides for a set of basic human rights; Article 13 specifies that these rights and freedoms will be interpreted according to the Universal Declaration of Human Rights, the International Covenant on Civil and Political Rights, and other international instruments adopted by Ethiopia.

The document further guarantees that all Ethiopian languages will enjoy equal state recognition, although Amharic is specified as the working language of the federal government.

Ethiopia has a tradition of highly personal and strongly centralized government, a pattern the Ethiopian People's Revolutionary Democratic Front (the former ruling government colation) had followed despite constitutional limits on federal power.

The first general election held after the adoption of the constitution was the 2000 election.

There were three earlier written constitutions of Ethiopia, the preceding one being the 1987 Constitution.

Controversy
The 1995 constitution has been subjected to constitutional crisis with involvement of few cliques to run their own agenda. Some critics claim that the constitution was drafted by the TPLF/EPRDF coalition in closed door and enacted overnight. 

The Constitutional Commission of the Transitional Government of Ethiopia (TGE) had worked with Regional Affairs Coordination Department for two years (1993 and 1994). The constitution organized public discussion from the grassroot kebele level to national level, involving many experts for advice while drafting. It also organized symposiums and forums of which the main draft provisions were discussed and debated Ethiopians. One of interesting feature of the discussion was the discussion conducted by article by article. After the discussion, participants voted for or against to each provision of the constitution, compiled the results at kebele, district, zone, region or national level.

Main provisions of the Constitution

Article 39
It deals with the rights of the nations, nationalities, and peoples of Ethiopia, including the provision that "Every Nation, Nationality and People in Ethiopia has an unconditional right to self-determination, including the right to secession".

The flag
Article 3(1) says "The Ethiopian flag shall consist of green at the top, yellow in the middle and red at the bottom, and shall have a national emblem at the center". Accordingly, the Flag and Emblem Proclamation No. 16/1996, Proclamation No. 48/1996 (Amendment) and Flag Proclamation No. 654/2009 enacted. Opponent of Article 3 defined different logo of the flag and subsequent laws by rejecting it. The Ethiopian government also failed to enforce its own constitutional laws in this regard. 

Article 3(3) authorized over the members of Federation to use their respective flags and emblems, which was opposed by pro-unitary groups. Few individuals opened debates through media about the flag and emblems of Ethiopia and gave guidance for the government.

Article 47
Article 47 of the constitution lists the members states of the Federal Democratic Republic of Ethiopia and enshrines the right of Nations, Nationalities and Peoples to establish their own States. Opponents objected about the Article come from Article 39, which stated that States should be divided into geographical lines (river, lakes etc) or economic class (pastoralists, farmers etc) rather than ethnolinguistic implications. Some Ethiopian government officials confused the argument; for example Prime Minister Abiy Ahmed conflated the term "boundary" and "border".

Other articles
Article 40(3): "land is a common property of the Nations, Nationalities and Peoples of Ethiopia and shall not be subject to sale or to other means of exchange".

Article 45: "the Federal Democratic Republic of Ethiopia shall have a parliamentarian form of government”. Some want presidential form of government."

Article 5: "all Ethiopian languages shall enjoy equal state recognition. 2. Amharic shall be the working language of the Federal Government”. Some want this to be changed and say “Amharic is the official language of Ethiopia."

Article 49: "the special interest of the State of Oromia in Addis Ababa."

See also 
 Constitutions of Ethiopia

References

External links

Constitution text
 Amharic and English (side-by-side), PDF from Embassy of Ethiopia in Brussels, Belgium
 English searchable PDF by World Intellectual Property Organization
 English online text by University of Berlin

Constitution Of Ethiopia, 1995
Constitutions of Ethiopia
1995 documents
1995 in law